The order of battle of the Croatian Special Police Units (SJP) in 1991–1995 included up to 30 individual special forces units subordinated to the Ministry of the Interior. The special police was created around the Ministry of the Interior's existing airborne special forces unit following an open revolt of the Croatian Serbs against the Government of Croatia in August 1990. It further developed with the increasing involvement of the Yugoslav People's Army in the conflict, supporting the Croatian Serbs. The conflict escalated into the Croatian War of Independence in 1991. The special police took part in the first clashes of the war in Pakrac and at the Plitvice Lakes. As Croatia had no army, the 3,000-strong special forces became the country's most effective fighting force.

Even though several special police units were transformed into the Croatian National Guard (later renamed the Croatian Army) in 1991, the special police continued to operate throughout the war as special forces units supporting virtually all army operations. The last large deployment of the special police in the war occurred in Operation Storm in August 1995, when the force contributed 3,100 troops to the offensive. During the war, the special police units lost 179 troops killed, 790 wounded and 14 missing.
The Special Police of the Republic of Croatia is the name for the special units of the Croatian police in charge of performing tasks in the fight against all forms of terrorism, ie in resolving hostage situations, kidnappings, the most serious forms of public disorder and arrests of armed individuals and groups in special conditions.

Establishment
In 1990, following the electoral defeat of the socialist government of Croatia by the Croatian Democratic Union (HDZ) representing a nationalist programme, ethnic tensions between Croats and Croatian Serbs worsened. The Yugoslav People's Army ( – JNA) believed Croatia would use the Croatian Territorial Defence Force's ( – TO) equipment to build its own army and confront the JNA itself. In order to minimize the expected resistance, the JNA confiscated the TO weapons. On 17 August, the tensions escalated into an open revolt of the Croatian Serbs against the Croatian Government, centred on the predominantly Serb-populated areas in Croatia—the Dalmatian hinterland around Knin, and various parts of the Lika, Kordun, Banovina and Slavonia regions. The JNA increasingly supported the Croatian Serb insurgents. The JNA stepped into the conflict, gradually increasing its support to the Croatian Serb insurgents.

Croatia had no regular army at the beginning of 1991. In an effort to bolster its defence, Croatia doubled its police personnel to about 20,000. The most effective part of the force was the 3,000-strong special police, deployed in twelve battalions, adopting special forces military organisation.

The first special police unit established in the 1990s was the Lučko Anti-Terrorist Unit (ATU). Its ranks were largely filled through the selection of police officers trained in Zagreb in 1990. A small number of other personnel were drawn from a special forces unit of the Croatian Ministry of the Interior that existed before the 1990s. Marko Lukić was the first commanding officer of the Lučko ATU.

Special police were visually distinguished by the gradual introduction of a green uniform with a shoulder patch worn on the right sleeve. Officially referred to as Sword and Lightning,(Mač i munja) the design of the Croatian special police shoulder sleeve insignia was inspired by the US Army Special Forces insignia.

In late 1991, the Ministry of the Interior established the Special Police Department to facilitate efficient command and control of the special police. It was reorganised into the Special Police Sector of the ministry in 1994 due to the expanding scope of its operations, including planning and oversight of training processes. The Joint Special Police Force framework was set up by the General Staff of the Armed Forces of the Republic of Croatia to integrate the special police into military operations. In major offensives, such as Operation Storm, when the force fielded 3,100 troops, the special police was directly subordinated to the General Staff of the Armed Forces.

Fielded units

The Special Police Airborne Unit, using three helicopters, was deployed on 17 August 1990 to quell a Croatian Serb insurrection in and around Knin. Established in 1968, it was the only combat capable unit of the Croatian military at that time. En route, two Yugoslav Air Force fighters intercepted the helicopters and forced them to land in Ogulin. The day is now considered to be the date when the first unit of the Croatian special police was founded. Following the incident, additional special police units were set up, the bulk of which were formed between September 1990 and September 1991.

The special police subsequently took part in all military operations in the Croatian War of Independence, sustaining losses of 179 troops killed, 790 wounded and 14 missing. Personnel of all units directly subordinated to the Ministry of the Interior were transferred to the Croatian National Guard (Zbor narodne garde – ZNG) by 15 May 1991, when four infantry brigades were established to replace the special police units disbanded in the process. A part of the force was transferred to the Zrinski Battalion—the first special forces unit of the ZNG established around former French Foreign Legion personnel on 18 May. The Airborne Unit, the Lučko ATU and the regionally organised units remained active throughout the war.

Regionally organised units

In November 1991, the Ministry of the Interior redefined the organisation of the special police force, retaining a few units under direct control of the ministry and assigning others to county police administrations. The move was devised in response to the advance of the JNA. The scheme included the establishment of an SPU in each of the 20 county police administrations. At the time, there were up to 19 such SPUs. Under the scheme, the Karlovac, Gospić, Osijek, Slavonski Brod and Zagreb SPUs were planned to have 180 troops each. The Rijeka, Sisak, Bjelovar and Šibenik SPUs were scheduled to comprise 150 troops each, while the Split, Zadar, Kutina, Vinkovci, Županja and Vukovar SPUs were planned as 120-strong units. The smallest, 100-strong units were to be based in Pula, Varaždin, Zabok and Dubrovnik. Overall, the scheme called for 2,620 active special police troops in the regionally organised units alone, and defined that each of the units should have a matching number of reserve troops.

No additional SPUs were set up in 1992, regardless of discrepancies between the November 1991 reorganisation scheme and the actual order of battle of the special police. Two additional SPUs were set up and assigned to the Koprivnica-Križevci and Požega-Slavonia police administrations in 1993. Following a reorganisation of the force carried out in 2001, the regionally based units were amalgamated into four units—Zagreb, Split, Rijeka and Osijek. At the same time, the special police was reduced to 300 personnel.

Notes

References
Books

 
 
 
 
 
 
 

Scientific journal articles

 
 
 
 

News reports

 
 
 
 
 
 
 
 
 
 
 
 
 

Other sources

 
 
 
 
 
 
 
 
 
 
 
 
 
 
 
 
 
 

1990s in Croatia
Croatian War of Independence
Law enforcement in Croatia
Military history of Croatia
Orders of battle